The United States National Geophysical Data Center (NGDC) provided scientific stewardship, products and services for geophysical data describing the solid earth, marine, and solar-terrestrial environment, as well as earth observations from space.  In 2015, NGDC was merged with the National Climatic Data Center (NCDC) and the National Oceanographic Data Center (NODC) into the National Centers for Environmental Information (NCEI).

Location and controlling bodies
The NGDC, was located in Boulder, Colorado as a part of the US Department of Commerce (USDOC), National Oceanic & Atmospheric Administration (NOAA), National Environmental Satellite, Data and Information Service (NESDIS).

Data holdings
NGDC's data holdings contained more than 300 digital and analog databases, some of which were very large. As technology advanced, so did the search for more efficient ways of preserving these data. This data is now maintained by the NCEI.

Data contributors
NGDC worked closely with contributors of scientific data to prepare documented, reliable data sets. They welcomed cooperative projects with other government agencies, nonprofit organizations, and universities, and encourage data exchange.

Data users
NGDC's data users included:

 private industry
 universities and other educational facilities
 research organizations
 federal, state, and local governments
 foreign governments, industry, and academia
 publishers and other mass media
 the general public

Data management
The Data Center developed data management programs that reflect the changing world of geophysics. These programs are now part of the National Centers for Environmental Information.

References

National Geophysical Data Center